Tighassaline is a town in Khénifra Province, Béni Mellal-Khénifra, Morocco. According to the 2004 census it has a population of 7336.  

It lies on the N8 highway, 26 kilometres south of Khénifra. Tighassaline hosts a weekly souk on Saturday, located at the northern edge of the town. The town is situated on a hill in a Middle Atlas valley, hemmed in by various mountains. To the south, Sidi Bou Ali sits near the top of Jbel al Bocta.

Demographics

References

Populated places in Khénifra Province